William Charles Fischer (March 2, 1891 – September 4, 1945) was a catcher in Major League Baseball.

Biography
Fischer was born in New York City. He started his professional baseball career in 1909. After the 1912 season, he was picked up by the Brooklyn Dodgers in the rule 5 draft and was their backup catcher in 1913 and 1914. In 1915, he jumped to the Chicago Whales of the Federal League.

Fischer had a career year in 1915, hitting .329 and finishing second in the batting race to Benny Kauff. The Whales won the pennant. However, the Federal League folded after the season, and Fischer was sent to the Chicago Cubs. He started off slow in 1916 and was traded to the Pittsburgh Pirates in July. He played in Pittsburgh for the next two years before his major league career ended.

Fischer died in Richmond, Virginia, in 1945.

References

External links

1891 births
1945 deaths
Major League Baseball catchers
Brooklyn Dodgers players
Brooklyn Robins players
Chicago Whales players
Chicago Cubs players
Pittsburgh Pirates players
Binghamton Bingoes players
Portland Beavers players
Baseball players from New York City